Llewellyn Paul Winckler (born 7 September 1987) is a former Namibian rugby union player who played as a wing represented Namibia internationally from 2008 to 2011. He made his international debut for Namibia against Zimbabwe on 2 August 2008. Winckler was included in the Namibian squad for the 2011 Rugby World Cup and played in two group stage matches.

References 

1987 births
Living people
Namibia international rugby union players
Namibian rugby union players
Rugby union players from Windhoek
Rugby union wings